Saša Kiš (Serbian Cyrillic: Саша Киш; born 7 April 1989) is a Serbian football midfielder.

References

External links
 
 Saša Kiš stats at utakmica.rs

1989 births
Living people
Serbian footballers
FK Hajduk Kula players
FK Mladost Apatin players
FK Voždovac players
FK Inđija players
Serbian SuperLiga players
Association football wingers
People from Vrbas, Serbia